Men's 50 metre rifle prone (then known as small-bore free rifle) was one of the thirteen shooting events at the 1992 Summer Olympics. It was the first Olympic competition after the introduction of the new target in 1989, and thus two Olympic records were set. The first was set by Hubert Bichler with 598 points in the qualification round. All his seven adversaries in the final started just one point behind him on 597. Two of them, Lee Eun-chul and Harald Stenvaag, surpassed him to win gold and silver respectively, with Lee establishing a new final Olympic record. Stevan Pletikosić finished on exactly the same score as Bichler, and the rules at the time broke the tie by best final score, giving Pletikosić the bronze medal.

Qualification round

OR Olympic record – Q Qualified for final

Final

OR Olympic record

References

Sources

Shooting at the 1992 Summer Olympics
Men's 050m prone 1992
Men's events at the 1992 Summer Olympics